X-Men II: Fall of the Mutants is an action-adventure game for DOS, developed and released by Paragon Software in 1990. It follows the story of the X-Men crossover storyline "Fall of the Mutants". The game is the sequel to Paragon's 1989 release X-Men: Madness in Murderworld.

Plot
The X-Men have come looking for their allies Storm and Forge, only to run into Freedom Force, who've been sent to capture them. Soon both teams find themselves caught in a bizarre time warp caused by the powerful being known as the Adversary, who has imprisoned Storm and Forge. Uatu the Watcher appears at the beginning and introduces the game as a parallel universe's version of the story from the "real" Marvel timeline in the vein of Marvel's What If? series, in this case, "What if a different team of heroes fought the Adversary?"

Gameplay
The game uses an overhead view during normal play as characters move around the map, as they look for enemies, health crates, and traps. When the X-Men encounter an enemy, the game switches to a side view close-up during the battle scenes. In each level the object is to search for a pair of Freedom Force members and defeat them in battle, but only the defeat of one villain will send the player's team to the next level. After completing enough levels the heroes are thrust into battle with the Adversary himself.

References

External links
 

1990 video games
DOS games
DOS-only games
North America-exclusive video games
Video games based on X-Men
Multiplayer and single-player video games
Superhero video games
Video games developed in the United States
Video games set in Dallas
Video games set in Vietnam